The Orlando USTA Pro Circuit Events are a series of tournaments for professional female tennis players played on outdoor hardcourts and outdoor clay courts. 

The events are classified as $60,000 and $25,000 ITF Women's World Tennis Tour tournaments and have been held in Orlando, Florida since 2013.

Past finals

Singles

Doubles

External links
 ITF search

ITF Women's World Tennis Tour
Clay court tennis tournaments
Hard court tennis tournaments
Tennis tournaments in the United States
Tennis tournaments in Florida
2013 establishments in Florida
Recurring sporting events established in 2013